Fosterburg (also Fosterburgh) is an unincorporated community in Madison County, Illinois, United States.

Notes

Unincorporated communities in Illinois
Unincorporated communities in Madison County, Illinois